The 1894–95 French Rugby Union Championship was won by Stade Français that defeated the Olympique in the final.

The tournament was played by four clubs from Paris : Stade Français, Racing, Cosmopolitan Club et Olympique.

The first two of the pool were admitted to the final .

Final

External links
 Compte rendu de la finale de 1895, sur lnr.fr

1895
France
Championship